The Czochralski method, also Czochralski technique or Czochralski process, is a method of crystal growth used to obtain single crystals of semiconductors (e.g. silicon, germanium and gallium arsenide), metals (e.g. palladium, platinum, silver, gold), salts and synthetic gemstones. The method is named after Polish scientist Jan Czochralski, who invented the method in 1915 while investigating the crystallization rates of metals. He made this discovery by accident: instead of dipping his pen into his inkwell, he dipped it in molten tin, and drew a tin filament, which later proved to be a single crystal.

The most important application may be the growth of large cylindrical ingots, or boules, of single crystal silicon used in the electronics industry to make semiconductor devices like integrated circuits. Other semiconductors, such as gallium arsenide, can also be grown by this method, although lower defect densities in this case can be obtained using variants of the Bridgman–Stockbarger method.

The method is not limited to production of metal or metalloid crystals. For example, it is used to manufacture very high-purity crystals of salts, including material with controlled isotopic composition, for use in particle physics experiments, with tight controls (part per billion measurements) on confounding metal ions and water absorbed during manufacture.

Application 

Monocrystalline silicon (mono-Si) grown by the Czochralski method is often referred to as monocrystalline Czochralski silicon (Cz-Si). It is the basic material in the production of integrated circuits used in computers, TVs, mobile phones and all types of electronic equipment and semiconductor devices. Monocrystalline silicon is also used in large quantities by the photovoltaic industry for the production of conventional mono-Si solar cells. The almost perfect crystal structure yields the highest light-to-electricity conversion efficiency for silicon.

Production of Czochralski silicon 

Dopant impurity atoms such as boron or phosphorus can be added to the molten silicon in precise amounts to dope the silicon, thus changing it into p-type or n-type silicon, with different electronic properties. A precisely oriented rod-mounted seed crystal is dipped into the molten silicon. The seed crystal's rod is slowly pulled upwards and rotated simultaneously. By precisely controlling the temperature gradients, rate of pulling and speed of rotation, it is possible to extract a large, single-crystal, cylindrical ingot from the melt. Occurrence of unwanted instabilities in the melt can be avoided by investigating and visualizing the temperature and velocity fields during the crystal growth process. This process is normally performed in an inert atmosphere, such as argon, in an inert chamber, such as quartz.

Crystal sizes

Due to efficiencies of scale, the semiconductor industry often uses wafers with standardized dimensions, or common wafer specifications. Early on, boules were small, a few cm wide. With advanced technology, high-end device manufacturers use 200 mm and 300 mm diameter wafers. Width is controlled by precise control of temperature, speeds of rotation, and the speed at which the seed holder is withdrawn. The crystal ingots from which wafers are sliced can be up to 2 metres in length, weighing several hundred kilograms. Larger wafers allow improvements in manufacturing efficiency, as more chips can be fabricated on each wafer, with lower relative loss, so there has been a steady drive to increase silicon wafer sizes. The next step up, 450 mm, is currently scheduled for introduction in 2018. Silicon wafers are typically about 0.2–0.75 mm thick, and can be polished to great flatness for making integrated circuits or textured for making solar cells.

The process begins when the chamber is heated to approximately 1500 degrees Celsius, melting the silicon. When the silicon is fully melted, a small seed crystal mounted on the end of a rotating shaft is slowly lowered until it dips just below the surface of the molten silicon. The shaft rotates counterclockwise and the crucible rotates clockwise. The rotating rod is then drawn upwards very slowly—at about 25 mm per hour when making a crystal of ruby—allowing a roughly cylindrical boule to be formed. The boule can be from one to two metres, depending on the amount of silicon in the crucible.

The electrical characteristics of the silicon are controlled by adding material like phosphorus or boron to the silicon before it is melted. The added material is called dopant and the process is called doping. This method is also used with semiconductor materials other than silicon, such as gallium arsenide.

Incorporating impurities

When silicon is grown by the Czochralski method, the melt is contained in a silica (quartz) crucible. During growth, the walls of the crucible dissolve into the melt and Czochralski silicon therefore contains oxygen at a typical concentration of 10 cm. Oxygen impurities can have beneficial or detrimental effects. Carefully chosen annealing conditions can give rise to the formation of oxygen precipitates. These have the effect of trapping unwanted transition metal impurities in a process known as gettering, improving the purity of surrounding silicon. However, formation of oxygen precipitates at unintended locations can also destroy electrical structures. Additionally, oxygen impurities can improve the mechanical strength of silicon wafers by immobilising any dislocations which may be introduced during device processing. It was experimentally shown in the 1990s that the high oxygen concentration is also beneficial for the radiation hardness of silicon particle detectors used in harsh radiation environment (such as CERN's LHC/HL-LHC projects). Therefore, radiation detectors made of Czochralski- and magnetic Czochralski-silicon are considered to be promising candidates for many future high-energy physics experiments. It has also been shown that the presence of oxygen in silicon increases impurity trapping during post-implantation annealing processes.

However, oxygen impurities can react with boron in an illuminated environment, such as that experienced by solar cells. This results in the formation of an electrically active boron–oxygen complex that detracts from cell performance. Module output drops by approximately 3% during the first few hours of light exposure.

Mathematical form
Concerning a mathematical expression of impurity incorporation from melt, consider the following.

The impurity concentration in the solid crystal that results from freezing an amount of volume can be obtained from consideration of the segregation coefficient.

: Segregation coefficient

: Initial volume
: Number of impurities
: Impurity concentration in the melt

: Volume of the melt
: Number of impurities in the melt
: Concentration of impurities in the melt

: Volume of solid
: Concentration of impurities in the solid

During the growth process, volume of melt  freezes, and there are impurities from the melt that are removed.

See also
 Float-zone silicon

References

External links
 Czochralski doping process
 

Industrial processes
Semiconductor growth
Crystals
Science and technology in Poland
Polish inventions
Methods of crystal growth